Towers Karpoš IV Tower II is a building, tied for second tallest building in North Macedonia. It is located in the Karpoš municipality of Skopje. Towers Karpoš IV Tower II stands at 19 stories.

See also
Towers Karpoš IV Tower I
Towers Karpoš IV Tower III
List of tallest buildings in North Macedonia

Buildings and structures in Skopje